NADH dehydrogenase [ubiquinone] flavoprotein 1, mitochondrial (NDUFV1) is an enzyme that in humans is encoded by the NDUFV1 gene. The NDUFV1 gene encodes the 51-kD subunit of complex I (NADH:ubiquinone oxidoreductase) of the mitochondrial respiratory chain. Defects in complex I are a common cause of mitochondrial dysfunction. Mitochondrial complex I deficiency is linked to myopathies, encephalomyopathies, and neurodegenerative disorders such as Parkinson's disease and Leigh syndrome.

Structure 
NDUFV1 is located on the q arm of chromosome 11 in position 13.2 and has 10 exons. The NDUFV1 gene produces a 50.8 kDa protein composed of 464 amino acids. NDUFV1, the protein encoded by this gene, is a member of the complex I 51 kDa subunit family. This subunit carries the NADH-binding site as well as flavin mononucleotide (FMN)- and Fe-S-binding sites. It also contains a transit peptide domain and is composed of 6 turns, 14 beta strands, and 19 alpha helixes.

Function 
Complex I is composed of 45 different subunits. NDUFV1 is a component of the flavoprotein-sulfur (FP) fragment of the enzyme. NDUFV1 is an oxidoreductase and core subunit of complex I that is thought to be required for assembly and catalysis. It is a peripheral membrane protein located on the matrix side of the mitochondrion inner membrane.

Catalytic Activity 
NADH + ubiquinone + 5 H+(In) = NAD+ + ubiquinol + 4 H+(Out).

NADH + acceptor = NAD+ + reduced acceptor.

Clinical significance 

Mutations in the NDUFV1 gene are associated with Mitochondrial Complex I Deficiency, which is autosomal recessive. This deficiency is the most common enzymatic defect of the oxidative phosphorylation disorders. Mitochondrial complex I deficiency shows extreme genetic heterogeneity and can be caused by mutation in nuclear-encoded genes or in mitochondrial-encoded genes. There are no obvious genotype–phenotype correlations, and inference of the underlying basis from the clinical or biochemical presentation is difficult, if not impossible. However, the majority of cases are caused by mutations in nuclear-encoded genes. It causes a wide range of clinical disorders, ranging from lethal neonatal disease to adult-onset neurodegenerative disorders. Phenotypes include macrocephaly with progressive leukodystrophy, nonspecific encephalopathy, hypertrophic cardiomyopathy, myopathy, liver disease, Leigh syndrome, Leber hereditary optic neuropathy, and some forms of Parkinson disease. Clinical manifestations can include lactic acidosis, cerebral degeneration, ophthalmoplegia, ataxia, spasticity, and dystonia resulting from mutations in NDUFV1.

Interactions 
NDUFV1 has been shown to have 103 binary protein-protein interactions including 97 co-complex interactions. NDUFV1 appears to interact with EWSR1, CREB1, NCOR1, and VDAC1.

References

Further reading 

 
 
 
 
 
 
 
 
 
 
 
 

Human proteins
EC 1.6.5